Wuert Engelmann (also spelled Weert) (February 11, 1908 – January 8, 1979) was a professional American football player who played running back for four seasons for the Green Bay Packers.

References

1908 births
1979 deaths
American football running backs
South Dakota State Jackrabbits football players
Green Bay Packers players
Players of American football from South Dakota
People from Miller, South Dakota